P. K. Balasubramanyan is a former Supreme Court of India judge who held the office from August 2004 to August 2007. Prior to this, Balasubramanyan was the chief justice at High Court of Jharkhand. The retired judge writes regularly for Outlook Magazine. He was appointed an independent arbitrator between Southern railways and a company called Cast Constructions P Ltd by Madras High Court to resolve a dispute.

References 

Indian judges
Living people
Justices of the Supreme Court of India
Chief Justices of the Jharkhand High Court
1942 births